Pycnarmon cribrata is a moth of the family Crambidae. It is known from Kenya, Zambia, Sierra Leone, South Africa, Malawi, Mozambique, the Democratic Republic of the Congo, Zambia and Zimbabwe.

Known host plants of the larvae of this species are Embelia robusta, Ocimum sanctum, Plectranthus parviflorus, Salvia coccinea, Solenstemon blumei and Vitex sp.

References

Moths described in 1794
Spilomelinae
Moths of Africa